City & Community is a quarterly peer-reviewed academic journal published by SAGE Publishing on behalf of the Community and Urban Sociology Section of the American Sociological Association. It was established in 2002 with Anthony Orum as the founding editor. The journal covers the interface of global and local issues, locally embedded social interaction and community life, urban culture and the meaning of place, and sociological approaches to urban political economy, as well as urban spatial arrangements, social impacts of local natural and built environments, urban and rural inequalities, virtual communities, and other topics germane to urban life and communities that will advance general sociological theory. The editor-in-chief is Richard E. Ocejo (Graduate Center, CUNY) and (John Jay College of Criminal Justice).

According to the Journal Citation Reports, the journal has a 2019 impact factor of 1.133.

Past editors
The following persons have been editors-in-chief:
 Deirdre Oakley (Georgia State University (2018-2020)
 Lance Freeman (Columbia University) (2015–2018)
 Sudhir Venkatesh (Columbia University) (2015–2017) 
 Hilary Silver (Brown University) (2009-2015)
 Anthony Orum (University of Illinois at Chicago) (2002-2009)

References

External links
 

Wiley-Blackwell academic journals
English-language journals
Publications established in 2002
Quarterly journals
American Sociological Association academic journals
Urban studies and planning journals